The Middlesex Greenway is a  rail trail in New Jersey Metuchen, Edison and Woodbridge. It is part of the Middlesex County Park System. It makes up a portion of the East Coast Greenway.

The trail begins at Crows Mill Road near William Street in the Fords/Keasbey section of Woodbridge and terminates in Metuchen at Middlesex Avenue, with 12 entry points. Construction costs were $5 million. Expansion to Perth Amboy and South Plainfield has also been proposed.

History
The trail's roadbed originates from the Easton & Amboy Railroad created by the Lehigh Valley Railroad in 1875 to transport anthracite coal to a transfer dock in Perth Amboy for subsequent delivery to New York City. The line was consolidated into Conrail with other bankrupt railroads in 1976, and abandoned in 1991.

Using open space funds, Middlesex County purchased the roadbed from Conrail in December 2002 for approximately $50,000. In 2004 Edison elected officials challenged NJDOT's plan to replace an original railroad trestle with a 140-foot-long tunnel-like structure to carry the trail under US Route 1. The proposed culvert would have reduced the trail's capacity to a 14-foot-wide by 10-foot-high passageway, potentially preventing mounted police from traversing the highway. NJDOT eventually agreed to construct a pedestrian bridge in lieu of the culvert. 

In 2005 Middlesex County acquired 2.68 acres of land adjacent to the trail to build a park along a portion of the abandoned roadbed at a cost of $1.25 million Middlesex
County and $100,000 from Metuchen.

Route description
The trail starts on Middlesex Avenue in Metutchen, and goes through an initial section which goes Southeast, and goes under the North East Corridor tracks. Upon leaving the underpass, the trail turns more eastward, and goes parallel to Memorial Parkway right alongside the Memorial Park, and then goes under Route 27. After crossing Route 27, the trail goes into a below street level section which continues under a footbridge at Graham Avenue, and shortly after goes under Route 531. The Greenway continues through a residential area in Metutchen, before the trail crosses the border into Edison and arrives at Pierson Avenue. The trail then goes over Route 1 on an overpass, which comes down after crossing into the Clara Barton section of Edison. The trail then crosses through Starkin Road, and then crosses Jackson Avenue right next to Herbert Hoover Middle School. The greenway crosses Liddle Avenue, and then goes under the New Jersey Turnpike before arriving at Woodbridge Avenue, which the trail crosses. The trail goes through several more blocks alongside residential homes, before going under King Georges Post Road at the Edison/Woodbridge Border, parallel to Route 440. The greenway goes next to the Hillside Gardens apartments before crossing under Crows Mill Road. The trail ends about a block before the Garden State Parkway.

Trail heads
Woodbridge, Crows Mill Road, Woodbridge
Metuchen, Middlesex Avenue, Metuchen

See also
Assunpink Trail
Delaware and Raritan Canal Trail
Henry Hudson Trail
Lenape Trail
West Essex Trail

References 

Rail trails in New Jersey
Transportation in Middlesex County, New Jersey
Metuchen, New Jersey
Woodbridge Township, New Jersey
Bike paths in New Jersey
Greenways